Many nations continue to research and/or stockpile chemical weapon agents despite numerous efforts to reduce or eliminate them. Most states have joined the Chemical Weapons Convention (CWC), which required the destruction of all chemical weapons by 2012. Twelve nations have declared chemical weapons production facilities and six nations have declared stockpiles of chemical weapons. All of the declared production facilities have been destroyed or converted to civilian use after the treaty went into force.

CWC states with declared stockpiles
Of 190 signatory nations to the CWC, state parties listed below have also declared stockpiles, agreed to monitored disposal, and verification, and in some cases, used chemical weapons in conflict. Both military targets and civilian populations have been affected; affected populations were not always damaged collaterally; instead, at times: themselves the target of the attack. , only North Korea and the United States are confirmed to have remaining stockpiles of chemical weapons.
India
Iraq
Japan
Libya
Russia
Syria
United States

Details by state

Albania

Albania, as a party to the Chemical Weapons Convention, declared in March 2003 a stockpile of 16 tons of chemical agents. On July 11, 2007, with the help of the U.S. government's Nunn–Lugar Cooperative Threat Reduction program, the Ministry of Defence announced successful destruction of the entire stockpile.

Angola
Angola has been accused of using chemical weapons in its civil war.

China
According to the testimony from Assistant Secretary of State for Intelligence and Research Carl W. Ford before the Senate Committee on Foreign Relations, it is very probable that China has an advanced chemical warfare program, including research and development, production, and weaponization capabilities. The United States is concerned by China's contact and sharing of chemical weapons expertise with other states of proliferation concern, including Syria and Iran. Chinese government has declared that it had possessed small arsenal of chemical weapons in the past but that it had destroyed it before ratifying Convention. It has declared only two former chemical production facilities that may have produced mustard gas and Lewisite.

Cuba

According to a United Nations finding which cited suspicious residue affecting plant and animal life during the Cuban intervention in Angola, sarin and VX had been deployed against Angolan militants by the Cuban Army.

Egypt
Egypt has not signed the Chemical Weapons Convention and has long appeared on various lists as having an offensive chemical weapons capability, and is thought to possess production facilities for sarin, VX, mustard gas, and phosgene. Before the Egypt–Israel peace treaty of 1979, the country played a pivotal role exporting chemical weapons and related technologies to other Arab countries. It is possible that Egypt may still possess limited stockpiles of chemical bombs, rockets and shells.

The reasons for this belief are several:
 Egypt is known to have employed mustard gas in the Yemeni civil war from 1963 to 1967.
 In the 1970s, Syria obtained its first chemical weapons from Egypt during the Yom Kippur War, but they were never employed in this conflict.
 In the 1980s, Egypt supplied Iraq with mustard gas and nerve agents, and related production and deployment technology.

In testimony before the Subcommittee on Seapower, Strategic and Critical Materials in 1991, US Navy Rear Admiral Thomas Brooks cited this evidence in identifying Egypt as a "probable" chemical weapons possessor.

More recent analyses are more careful by estimation the current status of chemical weapons program in Egypt. Only one facility has been identified as "likely involved" in the offensive activities. Although the offensive program may be still in existence, it does not seem that Egypt has a considerable stockpile of operational weapons.

Ethiopia
In 1991 Rear Admiral Thomas Brooks identified Ethiopia as a "probable" chemical weapons possessor in testimony before Congress. Ethiopia has ratified CWC in 1996 and did not declare any offensive CW program. From that time no evidence has been presented to contradict this statement.

India
On January 14, 1993, India became an original signatory to the CWC. India declared its stock of chemical weapons in June 1997. Germany's declaration came after the entry into force of the CWC that created the OPCW. India declared a stockpile of 1044 tonnes of sulfur mustard in its possession. 

In 2005, among the six nations that declared stockpiles of chemical weapons, India was the only one to meet its deadline for chemical weapons destruction and for inspection of its facilities by the OPCW. By the end of 2006, India had destroyed more than 75 percent of its chemical weapons/material stockpile and was granted an extension for destroying the remaining CW until April 2009. It was anticipated that India would achieve 100 percent destruction within that time frame. On May 14, 2009, India informed the United Nations that it had completely destroyed its stockpile of chemical weapons.

Iran
Near the end of the Iran–Iraq War, Iran is supposed to have made limited use of chemical weapons in response to multiple chemical attacks by Iraq. The delivery vehicles Iran supposedly possesses includes artillery shells, mortars, rockets, and aerial bombs.

According to the Center for Strategic and International Studies, a Washington D.C. based think tank, Iran currently maintains at least two major facilities for the research and production of chemical weapon agents. Iran began its production of nerve agents no later than 1994. The accuracy of these claims has not been verified.

Iran signed the Chemical Weapons Convention on January 13, 1993 and ratified it on November 3, 1997, and denies allegations of having clandestine CW program in violation of CWC. In the official declaration submitted to OPCW Iranian government admitted that it had produced mustard gas in 1980s but that ceased the offensive program and destroyed the stockpiles of operational weapons after the end of war with Iraq.

Iraq

Well before Operation Desert Storm or the U.N. inspections that followed it, Iraq had already begun to build chemical weapons. After launching a research effort in the 1970s, Iraq was able to use chemical weapons in its war against Iran and to kill large numbers of its own Kurdish population in the 1980s. On June 28, 1987 in Sardasht, on two separate attacks against four residential areas, victims were estimated as 10 civilians dead and 650 civilians injured. Iraq massively used chemical weapons during Iran–Iraq War, and so far, Kurdish people are the biggest victims of chemical weapons. Iraq used mustard gas in an attack against Kurdish people on March 16, 1988, Halabja chemical attack. The attack killed between 3,200 and 5,000 people and injured 7,000 to 10,000 more, most of them civilians. During Iraqi chemical attacks against Iran, many Iranian military forces were killed by nerve agents. At the time, the attacks were actively supported by the United States.

During the first Gulf War, there were fears that Iraq would launch chemical-tipped missiles at its neighbors, particularly Israel, but Iraq refrained for fear of U.S. retaliation.  During Operation Iraqi Freedom, coalition troops again feared they might be hit with chemical weapons, though this did not come to pass.

By 1991, as part of the 1991 Gulf War ceasefire agreement, the United Nations passed Resolution 687 which established its Special Commission (UNSCOM). The UNSCOM was charged with the task of destroying, removing, or rendering harmless "all chemical and biological weapons and all stocks of agents and all related subsystems and components and all research, development, support and manufacturing facilities."

By the time UNSCOM left Iraq in December 1998, it had eliminated a large portion of Iraq's chemical weapon potential. UNSCOM had overseen the destruction or incapacitation of more than 88,000 filled or unfilled chemical munitions, over 600 tons of weaponized or bulk chemical agents, some 4,000 tons of precursor chemicals, some 980 pieces of key production equipment, and some 300 pieces of analytical equipment. Notwithstanding these extraordinary achievements, there remained important uncertainties regarding Iraq's holdings of chemical weapons, their precursors, and munitions.

The Organisation for the Prohibition of Chemical Weapons, which oversees destruction measures, has announced "The government of Iraq has deposited its instrument of accession to the Chemical Weapons Convention with the Secretary General of the United Nations and within 30 days, on 12 February 2009, will become the 186th State Party to the Convention". Iraq has also declared stockpiles of CW, and because of their recent accession is the only State Party exempted from the destruction time-line. On September 7, 2011, Hoshyar Zebari entered the OPCW headquarters, becoming the first Iraqi Foreign Minister to officially visit since the country joined the CWC.

Israel
As of 2015, Israel has signed but not ratified the Chemical Weapons Convention, and according to the Russian Federation Foreign Intelligence Service, Israel has significant stores of chemical weapons of its own manufacture. It possesses a highly developed chemical and petrochemical industry, skilled specialists, and stocks of source material, and is capable of producing several nerve, blister and incapacitating agents. A 2005 report from the Swedish Defence Research Agency concluded that Israel is probably not actively producing "traditional" chemical weapons, but may have a functional stockpile of previously produced material. Assessment of Israeli chemical weapons capabilities are generally redacted from declassified U.S. documents.

Although Israel has signed the CWC, it has not ratified the treaty and therefore is not officially bound by its tenets. The country is believed to have a significant stockpile of chemical weapons, likely the most abundant in the Middle-East, according to the Russian Foreign Intelligence Service. A 1983 CIA report stated that Israel, after "finding itself surrounded by front-line Arab states with budding chemical weapon capabilities, became increasingly conscious of its vulnerability to chemical attack ... undertook a program of chemical warfare preparations in both offensive and protective areas ... In late 1982, a probable CW nerve agent production facility and a storage facility were identified at the Dimona Sensitive Storage Area in the Negev Desert. Other CW agent production is believed to exist within a well-developed Israeli chemical industry."

In 1974, in a hearing before the U.S. Senate Armed Services Committee, General Almquist stated that Israel had an offensive chemical weapons capability.

In 1992, El Al Flight 1862 bound for Tel Aviv crashed outside Amsterdam. In the course of the crash investigation, it was revealed that amongst the plane's cargo was fifty gallons of dimethyl methylphosphonate, a CWC schedule 2 chemical that can be used in the production of the nerve agent sarin. The dimethyl methylphosphonate was bound for the Israel Institute for Biological Research in Ness Ziona, a top secret military installation outside Tel Aviv that was also responsible for producing the poison used in a September 1997 assassination attempt on a leader of the Palestinian militant organization Hamas (Khaled Mashal). According to Israeli officials, the substance was only for defensive research purposes, to test filters for gas masks. This shipment was coming from a US chemical plant to the IIBR under a US Department of Commerce license.

The 1993 the U.S. Congress Office of Technology Assessment WMD proliferation assessment recorded Israel as a country generally reported as having undeclared offensive chemical warfare capabilities.

In October 1998, the London Sunday Times reported that Israeli F-16 fighters were equipped to carry chemical weapons, and that their crews have been trained on the use of such weapons.

Japan

Japan both employed and stored chemical weapons on the territory of mainland China between 1937 and 1945, leaving approximately two million tons of chemical weapons in China at the end of the war. The weapons mostly contained a mustard gas-lewisite mixture. They are classified as abandoned chemical weapons under the CWC; their destruction under a joint Japan-China program started in September 2010, in Nanjing using mobile destruction facilities.

As of December 1993, Japan has signed the Chemical Weapons Convention. Japan ratified the Chemical Weapons Convention in 1995. The JSDF has chemical weapon facilities and some samples for use in development of protection against chemical weapons which it said JGSDF Central NBC protection Troop. In 1995, JGSDF admitted possession of samples of sarin.

Libya
Libya produced limited quantities of chemical weapons during the 1980s, and is known to have used such weapons in combat at least once when it attempted to use chemical weapons against Chadian troops in 1987.

Since then, Libya constructed what is believed to be the largest chemical weapon production facility in the developing world in the Rabta industrial complex. This facility was the cornerstone of the Libyan CW program, and has produced mustard gas, sarin, and phosgene since production began in the late 1980s. In March 1990 a suspicious fire broke out there following accusations by the United States.

Strict United Nations sanctions from 1992 to 1999 rendered Rabta inactive.

Libya used chemical weapons, under Muammar Gaddafi's regime, in a war with Chad. In 2003, Gaddafi agreed to accede to the CWC in exchange for "rapprochement" with western nations. At the time of the Libyan uprising against Gaddafi, Libya still controlled approximately 11.25 tons of poisonous mustard gas. Because of destabilization, concerns increased regarding possibilities and likelihood that control of these agents could be lost. With terrorism at the core of concern, international bodies cooperated to ensure Libya is held to its obligations under the treaty. Libya's post-Gaddafi National Transitional Council is cooperating with the Organisation for the Prohibition of Chemical Weapons regarding the destruction of all legacy chemical weapons in the country. After assessing the chemical stockpiles, the Libyan government will receive a deadline from the OPCW to destroy the CW.

Libya's chemical program was completely abandoned on December 19, 2003 along with their other weapons of mass destruction programs as part of a program to get sanctions lifted and normalize relations with foreign governments. In 2004, between 27 February and 3 March, Libya destroyed 3,200 chemical weapon artillery shells under supervision of the Organisation for the Prohibition of Chemical Weapons (OPCW). On 5 March 2004, Libya declared a stockpile of 23 tons of mustard gas as well as precursors for sarin and other chemicals. Libya officially acceded to the Chemical Weapons Convention in June 2004.

On 12 January 2018, the United States acknowledged that Libya has destroyed its remaining chemical weapons stockpile.

Myanmar
Intelligence regarding Myanmar's chemical weapon status is mixed, and sometimes contradictory. In the late 1990s, US naval intelligence identified Myanmar (then referred to as Burma) as developing chemical weapons capabilities. Later, other officials contradicted that statement, claiming that the evidence supporting Burma's chemical stockpile development was primarily based upon circumstantial evidence.

In July 2014 five journalists in Myanmar were sentenced to ten years in jail after publishing a report saying Myanmar was  planning to build a new chemical weapons plant on farmland in the country's Magwe Region.

Myanmar signed the Chemical Weapons Convention on 14 January 1993, and ratified the agreement on 8 July 2015. The convention entered into effect 7 August 2015.

North Korea
North Korea did not sign CWC and is believed to have maintained an extensive chemical weapons program since the mid-1950s. The program includes research, production, stockpiling and weaponisation of large quantities of chemical agents (perhaps as many as 5000 tons), including blister, nerve, choking, psychoincapacitant, vomiting and riot control agents. Several dozen facilities have been identified as likely involved in the offensive program. The production capability of these facilities is estimated as 4500 tons of chemical agents per year. North Korean armed forces also have large quantities of delivery systems that could carry chemical warheads, including different artillery systems, aerial bombs, mines, tactical ballistic missiles (SCUD), and long-range ballistic missiles (Nodong and Taepodong-2 systems). The technological advancement of this program is uncertain, and some sources doubt whether North Korea is able to produce large quantities of nerve agents or fit the chemical warheads on its long-range ballistic missiles.

It reportedly acquired the technology necessary to produce tabun and mustard gas as early as the 1950s. In 2009, the International Crisis Group reported that the consensus expert view was that North Korea had a stockpile of about 2,500 to 5,000 tonnes of chemical weapons, including mustard gas, sarin (GB) and other nerve agents including VX.

Pakistan

Since 1970s–80, Pakistan had been long suspected of running a possible military chemical weapons program both by Soviet Union and the United States. In 1991, Rear Admiral Thomas Brooks identified Pakistan as a "probable" chemical weapons possessor in testimony before Congress. In 1992, India and Pakistan signed a bilateral arms control treaty of chemical weapons that requires both countries to make a commitment to not develop, possess or use chemical weapons.

On January 13, 1993, Pakistan became an original signatory of Chemical Weapons Convention (CWC), and ratifying the treaty on November 27, 1997. Since being its signatory, the Pakistan is not known to have ever possessed a militarized chemical weapons program, and is a member in good standing of the Organisation for the Prohibition of Chemical Weapons (OPCW). Despite its good standing, Pakistan has been accused of covertly running a military chemical weapons program– the accusations primarily made by India since 1970s. Indian assertion, however, is primarily based on importing of toxic chemicals and metals and absence of the absence of their use in the civilian biochemical industry. 

In 1999, Pakistan, addressing the Indian allegations at the United Nations, announced a mandate and regulate for all domestic chemical producers to "furnish details of the chemicals" imported or used in Pakistan.

Russia

Russia entered the CWC with the largest declared stockpile of chemical weapons. By 2010 the country had destroyed 18,241 tonnes at destruction facilities located in Gorny (Saratov Oblast) and Kambarka (Udmurt Republic), where operations have finished, and Shchuchye (Kurgan Oblast), Maradykovsky (Kirov Oblast), Leonidovka (Penza Oblast) while installations are under construction in Pochep (Bryansk Oblast) and Kizner (Udmurt Republic). By 2016, Russia destroyed around 94% of its chemical weapons, planning to completely destroy its remaining stockpile by the end of 2018. On September 27, 2017 Russia announced the destruction of the last batch of chemical weapons, completing the total destruction of its chemical arsenal, ahead of schedule.

On March 4, 2018, Russia was alleged to have conducted a chemical attack in Salisbury, UK that left 5 injured including the alleged target of the attack, Sergei Skripal.

Russia destroyed about 25,000 metric tons of chemical weapons, or 62 percent of its 40,000-ton stockpile as of April 29, 2012 – the deadline set by the Chemical Weapons Convention for complete arsenal destruction. Russia  expected 2020 to be more realistic but according to Russia it achieved complete destruction on September 27, 2017.

Serbia and Montenegro
The former Yugoslavia is known to have produced a variety of chemical weapons (CW). The majority of stockpiled CW is believed to have been inherited by its successor, Serbia.

Reports indicate that the former Yugoslavia's Army produced large quantities of sarin (50 tons), sulfur mustard, phosgene, the incapacitant BZ (allegedly a stockpile of 300 tons), and tear gas. At least four chemical warfare production facilities have been identified in Serbia: Prva Iskra in Baric; Miloje Blagojevic in Lucani; and Milojie Zakic and Merima in Krusevac. While the Trajal plant in Krusevac has been shut down, serious questions exist about accounting and previous production and storage of chemical materials there, as well the lack of accounting on the other three sites.

Yugoslavia used its CW technologies to develop chemical munitions for Iraq prior to the first Gulf War in the "Little Hawk" program and chemical munitions for the Orkan MLRS system under the "KOL15" program.

The former Yugoslavia signed the Geneva Protocol in 1929. In April 2000, the Federal Republic of Yugoslavia acceded to the Chemical Weapons Convention (CWC).

South Korea
Prior to 1997, South Korea was strongly suspected of possessing an active chemical weapons program, and was identified as a "probable" chemical weapons possessor by the United States.

On April 18, 1997, South Korea signed the Chemical Weapons Convention and made a secret declaration. It is thought that South Korea is the "state party" referred to in Chemical Weapons Convention materials. There are reports that South Korea is operating a secret facility in Yeongdong County, Chungcheongbuk-do Province for the destruction of chemical agents.

South Sudan
In February 2016, the Sudan People's Liberation Movement-in-Opposition accused the South Sudanese government of attacking them with chemical weapons in the ongoing South Sudanese Civil War.

Sudan
Some past reports of uncertain credibility indicated that Sudan may have used chemical weapons against the rebels in the southern part of this country. Sudan accessed to CWC in 1999 and did not declare any offensive CW program. U.S. Department of State claims that it lacks sufficient evidence to determine whether Sudan is engaged in activities prohibited by CWC.

Syria

Prior to September 2013, Syria was one of seven states not party to the Chemical Weapons Convention. As a party to the 1925 Geneva Protocol, it was prohibited from using chemical weapons in war yet unhindered in their production, storage and transfer.

When questioned about the topic, Syrian officials stated that they feel it is an appropriate deterrent against Israel's undeclared nuclear weapons program which they believe exists. On July 23, 2012, the Syrian government acknowledged, for the first time, that it had chemical weapons.

Independent assessments indicate that Syria could have produced up to a few hundred tons of chemical agent per year. Syria reportedly manufactures the unitary agents: Sarin, Tabun, VX, and mustard gas.

Syrian chemical weapons production facilities have been identified by Western nonproliferation experts at the following 5 sites, plus a suspected weapons base:

 Al Safir (Scud missile base)
 Cerin
 Hama
 Homs
 Latakia
 Palmyra

In July 2007, a Syrian arms depot exploded, killing at least 15 Syrians.  Jane's Defence Weekly, a UK magazine reporting on military and corporate affairs, believed that the explosion happened when Iranian and Syrian military personnel attempted to fit a Scud missile with a mustard gas warhead. Syria stated that the blast was accidental and not chemical related.

On July 13, 2012, the Syrian government moved its stockpile to an undisclosed location.

In September 2012, information emerged that the Syrian military had begun testing chemical weapons, and was reinforcing and resupplying a base housing these weapons located east of Aleppo in August.

On March 19, 2013, news emerged from Syria indicating the first use of chemical weapons since the beginning of the Syrian uprising.

On August 21, 2013, testimony and photographic evidence emerged from Syria indicating a large-scale chemical weapons attack on Ghouta, a populated urban center.

An agreement was reached September 14, 2013, called the Framework For Elimination of Syrian Chemical Weapons, leading to the elimination of Syria's chemical weapon stockpiles by mid-2014.

On October 14, 2013, Syria officially acceded to the Chemical Weapons Convention.

On September 14, 2013, the United States and Russia announced an agreement that would lead to the elimination of Syria's chemical weapon stockpiles by mid-2014. Syria officially acceded to the CWC on October 14, but has yet to sign the Comprehensive Test Ban Treaty. It is believed Syria first received chemical weapons in 1973 from Egypt in the form of artillery shells. Since then it is thought Syria has one of the most advanced chemical weapons programs in the Middle East.

Syria's chemical arsenal

Syria is thought to have amassed large quantities of sarin, tabun, and mustard and is currently weaponizing VX. Exact quantities are hard to know although the CIA has estimated Syria possesses several hundred liters of chemical weapons with hundreds of tons of agents produced annually.

Production

Syria has four main production sites. One just north of Damascus, one near Homs, one in Hama and one, al-Safir south-east of Aleppo.

Taiwan

U.S. Congress was informed in 1989 that Taiwan could have acquired offensive chemical weapons capability, including stockpiles of sarin. The alleged facilities include Tsishan and Kuanhsi. Taiwanese authorities acknowledged only the existence of defensive research program.

Turkey
Turkey emerged from the cold war relatively unprotected and is gravely concerned about the acquisition of weapons of mass destruction, particularly chemical weapons that have been used in the vicinity of the Turkish state. Turkey is party to both the Chemical Weapons Convention since 1997 and the Biological Weapons Convention since 1974.

Turkey has been accused of using chemical weapons in Afrin against Kurdish rebels, but the country has denied that civilians in its operation against the Kurdish YPG fighters in northwestern Syria were affected by chemical weapons from the Turkish military. The country has sharply condemned and verified some of the chemical weapons used in the Syrian civil war.

United States

The United States has used multiple types of chemical weapons in war and peace time occasions as well as the testing of how chemical weapons will disperse in different climates Operation LAC. The police periodically use tear gas against violent protests which is banned from military usage. The United States has possessed a stockpile of chemical weapons since World War I. It banned the production or transport of chemical weapons in 1969. The U.S. began chemical weapons disposal in the 1960s, first by deep-sea burial. By the 1970s, incineration was the disposal method used. The use of chemical weapons was renounced in 1991 and the U.S. signed the Chemical Weapons Convention in 1993. 89.75% of the treaty declared stockpile was destroyed by January 2012.

The United States has destroyed about 90% of the chemical weapons stockpile it declared in 1997, guided by RCRA regulations. As of 2012 complete destruction was not expected until 2023.

The U.S. policy on the use of chemical weapons is to reserve the right to retaliate. First use, or preemptive use, is a violation of stated policy. Only the president of the United States can authorize the first retaliatory use.
 Official policy now reflects the likelihood of chemical weapons being used as a terrorist weapon.

See also
Weapon of mass destruction
Commission on the Prevention of WMD proliferation and terrorism
Chemical Weapons Convention
Ten Threats identified by United Nations

References

Resources
National Counterproliferation Center - Office of the Director of National Intelligence
 Economist. (May 2, 1997). "Chemical Weapons. Just Checking," The Economist 347, p. 42.
 Mahnaimi, Uzi (Oct., 1998). Israeli Jets Equipped For Chemical Warfare. London Sunday Times
 Monterey Institute of International Studies. (Apr 9, 2002). Chemical and Biological Weapons: Possession and Programs Past and Present. Retrieved Dec. 21, 2004.
 Senate Armed Services Committee, FY 1975 Authorization Hearing, Part 5, March 7, 1974
 Shoham, Dany. (1998). Chemical and Biological Weapons in Egypt. The Nonproliferation Review 5 (Spring-Summer 1998), 48–58.
 Stockholm International Peace Research Institute's research on disarmament, arms control and non-proliferation
 Russian Biological and Chemical Weapons, a useful page about non-state weapons transfers with a lot of links to information from CRS, the GAO and NGOs.

Chemical warfare
Chemical weapons demilitarization